Kishangarh Renwal is a city and a municipality in Jaipur district in the Rajasthan state of India.State Highway 19A passing through the city.

Foundation of City
The City Founder was Chomu Ruler Raja Sri Kishan Singh.

Architecture of City

City architecture is look alike Pink City Jaipur.

Demographics
 India census, Kishangarh Renwal had a population of 3
31321 Kishangarh Renwal has an literacy rate of 75.82%, higher than the national average of 72.99% and lower than the national urban average of 84.11%. Male literacy is 87.96%, and female literacy is 63.14%. 13.9% of the population is under 6 years of age.

References

Cities and towns in Jaipur district